Samir Fazlagić  (born 21 October 1982) is a former professional football player who last played for Kongsvinger. He first played in Stabæk.

Fazlagić has played three games for Norway's national under-21 football team.

References

External links
Samir Fazlagić on Altomfotball 

1982 births
Living people
Bosnia and Herzegovina emigrants to Norway
Norwegian footballers
Norway under-21 international footballers
Stabæk Fotball players
Skeid Fotball players
Strømsgodset Toppfotball players
Nybergsund IL players
Kongsvinger IL Toppfotball players
Eliteserien players
Norwegian First Division players
Association football defenders